The Ballaarat steam engine was built in Ballarat, Victoria in 1871 and was the first  gauge locomotive built in Australia. It was purchased by Western Australian Timber Company, which was awarded one of only three WA milling concessions granted. The company had 181,500 acres to mill at Yoganup near Busselton.

History

Active use 
The Western Australian Timber Company built the state’s first timber railway line (it included a steel strip along the top to protect the timber) and a 300-foot landing jetty at Lockeville (near Wonnerup) in preparation for timber transport. Timber milling was the region’s biggest industry and timber was the biggest export industry in Western Australia until World War 1.

The  narrow gauge steam locomotive was named Ballaarat by the Mayor of Melbourne, after the original spelling of the town where it was built, Ballarat, originating from two Aboriginal words balla arat, which mean resting place.

The Ballaarat was used by the Western Australian Timber Company until the mill closed in 1887.

Abandonment and repair 
It was left abandoned in Lockeville and damaged by fire when it was stored in a shed in the early 1900s, and then left exposed to the elements on a paddock.

What was left of the Ballaarat was later donated by landowner Percy Reynolds to the Municipality of Busselton. It was offered to the Western Australian Museum and then the Western Australian Government Railways who after many years of correspondence, eventually accepted and moved Ballaarat to Midland for refitting. It was not until 1929, 42 years after it was decommissioned, that Ballaarat finally received partial repair work thanks to it being featured in a State Centenary parade through Perth.

As a display piece 
Ballaarat remained in Perth for several years until the Busselton community intervened in 1934 when they requested the engine’s return. After three years of lobbying, the Ballaarat returned home and was installed as a display piece in Victoria Square in 1937. It had pride of place in the square and was visited by thousands of locals and tourists over the years but being exposed to the elements for 75 years left it weather beaten and rusted.

It was now the oldest Australian built steam locomotive still in existence.

In 2012, following a Lotterywest grant, local business South West Machining Centre and a team of volunteers and a Rail Heritage Consultant undertook its preservation works. The engine was completely disassembled and more than 550 volunteer hours were recorded.

In February 2016 Ballarat was moved to its present site on the Busselton foreshore and the remaining work was carried out on it in situ.

When the City of Busselton planned to have the old railway station repurposed as the Visitor Centre, it decided to include a verandah area for the engine. This then became an enclosed area and eventually a large enclosed room also used as an exhibition space and function venue.

Restoration was completed in March 2017 and since that time Ballaarat has been on public display along with information, artefacts and images on the region’s timber industry.

2021 marks the 150th anniversary of the building of Busselton’s Ballaarat Steam Engine and the City of Busselton has plans to mark the milestone with a special exhibition in 2021 showcasing its history and stories surrounding its 150 years.

Ballaarat as a live steam model 

The Ballaarat was modelled as a 5 gauge working live steam model, by Luker. The model runs on coal or anthracite and has a fully functioning steam boiler (2L capacity) which runs at 90Psi steam pressure. A construction series dedicated to describing the building of the Ballaarat model was featured in Model Engineer, aimed at the beginner who wants to get into the Model Engineering hobby.

See also 
 WAGR G class G233 Leschenault Lady

References

External links

Busselton
Individual locomotives of Australia
Railway locomotives introduced in 1871
 Ballaarat
0-4-0 locomotives
3 ft 6 in gauge locomotives of Australia